Tayozhny is a rural locality (a settlement) in Dzhalindinsky Selsoviet of Skovorodinsky District, Amur Oblast, Russia. The population was 45 as of 2018. There are 5 streets.

Geography 
Tayozhny is located 48 km south of Skovorodino (the district's administrative centre) by road. Srednereynovsky is the nearest rural locality.

References 

Rural localities in Skovorodinsky District